Culture&, formerly Cultural Co-operation, is a British charity which "work[s] in partnership with arts and heritage institutions and artists to develop programmes that promote diversity in the workforce and expand audiences".  Miranda Lowe was appointed its chair in March 2021.

References

Cultural charities based in the United Kingdom